Lessonia corrugata is a species of kelp, a brown algae in the genus Lessonia, commonly known as strapweed, common crapweed, or Tasmanian kombu. It is a subtidal species endemic to Tasmania and southern Victoria, Australia, and is one of only three Laminarian kelps to occur in the region. It is most closely related to the New Zealand species Lessonia variegata. The species was first described by Arthur Henry Shakespeare Lucas in 1931.

Lessonia corrugata is a dominant species in some Tasmanian kelp forests, but remains poorly studied. It is currently being developed for aquaculture, to produce food and for environmental remediation purposes in IMTA finfish farms.

Description
Lessonia corrugata is a large, brown macroalgae that averages 1.5 m (0.5 ft) in length. It is characterised by distinct longitudinal corrugations on its blades that give the kelp its name. These blades arise from the holdfast via basal splitting and become long and linear as they grow. The blades lack pneumatocysts, meaning that the kelp is negatively buoyant and displays a prostrate growth form, lying flat across the substrate. 

Like all Laminarian kelps, the life cycle of L. corrugata is a heteromorphic alteration of generations between microscopic gametophyte and macroscopic sporophyte life stages. L. corrugata reproduces from linear sori of sporangia and paraphyses located within the concavities of the corrugations on the blades.

Ecology
Lessonia corrugata grows in areas of moderate to strong water movement. It is typically found at depths of 1-4 m, but has been recorded as deep as 18-20 m at some sites. It generally occurs in shallower and more exposed locations than other dominant canopy-forming Phaeophyceae species in the region, namely Ecklonia radiata and Phyllospora comosa.

Lessonia corrugata is restricted to a narrow temperature range, with an optimal temperature range for gametophyte growth and sexual development of between 15.7 and 17.9˚C.< Coupled with its small geographic range, this makes the species particularly sensitive to threats such as rising sea surface temperatures, which may impact the recruitment and long-term survival of L. corrugata.

See also
 List of seaweeds and marine flowering plants of Australia (temperate waters)

References

corrugata
Species described in 1931